A kham is a percussion instrument made of wood and goat skin. It is used in dances by the tribes of the Indian state of Tripura. It is roughly cylindrical and has a membrane at each end. The kham is suspended from the neck, tied to the waist and played with the hands.

References

Asian percussion instruments
Culture of Tripura
Indian musical instruments